The women's 800 metre freestyle event at the 1968 Olympic Games took place between 22 and 24 October. This swimming event used freestyle swimming, which means that the method of the stroke is not regulated (unlike backstroke, breaststroke, and butterfly events). Nearly all swimmers use the front crawl or a variant of that stroke. Because an Olympic size swimming pool is 50 metres long, this race consisted of sixteen lengths of the pool.

Medalists

Results

Heats
Heat 1

Heat 2

Heat 3

Heat 4

Heat 5

Final

Key: OR = Olympic record

References

Women's freestyle 800 metre
1968 in women's swimming
Women's events at the 1968 Summer Olympics